For the similarly named Star Trek race, see Tellarite.

Tellurite can may refer to;
Tellurite (mineral), a mineral form of tellurium dioxide
Tellurite (ion), a tellurium containing anion